Palliser Regional Park is a park located on Lake Diefenbaker, in Riverhurst, Saskatchewan. It is named after John Palliser, namesake of the Palliser expedition, who reportedly camped in or near the park site in 1857. The park was founded around 1963.

See also
List of protected areas of Saskatchewan
Tourism in Saskatchewan

References

External links
Official website

Maple Bush No. 224, Saskatchewan
Parks in Saskatchewan